Declaration of Intention, also called the Declaration of Intent, may refer to:

A part of the betrothal rite, the blessing and ratifying of an engagement in some denominations of Christianity
A part of the service of Holy Matrimony in some denominations of Christianity in which the marriage parties affirm their desire to be wed 
A step in the process of Naturalization in the United States